Johann August Just (c. 1750 in Gröningen – December 1791? in The Hague) was a German keyboard player, violinist and composer.

He wrote a number of works for keyboard and chamber ensembles, many of a pedagogical nature, and at least two one-act operas.

He became music master to the Princess of Orange.

There is much uncertainty about his date of birth (variously given as 1750, 1758, or 1760) and date and place of death. It appears that he was born in Gröningen in Germany, but a number of reference articles have confused this with Groningen in the east of the Netherlands.

Some of his works have been recorded by the German ensemble Trio 1790.

Works (incomplete list)

Keyboard and chamber ensemble 
Opus 1: Six divertissements pour clavecin et violon
Opus 2: Six sonates pour le clavecin ou le piano-forte, avec accompagnement de violon ou flûte et violoncelle ad libitum - also referred to as Piano trios
Opus 3: Six favourite sonatinas for the harpsichord composed for the use of beginners
Opus 4: Six concertos with instrumental parts for a violon principal with accompaniments
Opus 5: Six sonatinas for the harpsichord with an accompaniment for a violin for the use of young practitioners and a favorite march with variations
Opus 6: Six divertissements pour clavecin ou forte-piano avec accompagnement de violon
Opus 7: Six sonates pour le clavecin ou piano-forte avec accompagnement d'un violon obligé
Opus 11: Six sonates aisées pour clavecin ou forte-piano avec accompagnement de violon
Opus 12: Six divertissements pour le clavecin ou piano-forte à quatres mains
Opus 17: Six duos à deux violons
Minuet (for keyboard, two hands) (No opus number) in: New instructions for playing the harpsichord, piano-forte or spinnet etc.

Operas 
 Opera (Singspiel) in one act: De sympathie, Amsterdam, 1772 
 Opera (Singspiel) in one act: De koopman van Smyrna (The merchant of Smyrna), Amsterdam, 1773 
 Opera Le page, The Hague, 1777

References

External links

1750 births
1791 deaths
Year of birth uncertain
Year of death uncertain
German male composers
18th-century German composers
18th-century German male musicians
German classical pianists
Male classical pianists
18th-century keyboardists
People from Gröningen
Pupils of Johann Kirnberger
German male pianists